Peter Sweetser Dean (born March 6, 1951) is an American sailor. He won a bronze medal in the Tempest class with Glen Foster at the 1972 Summer Olympics. He was born in Boston, Massachusetts.

References

External links
 
 
 

1951 births
Living people
American male sailors (sport)
Olympic bronze medalists for the United States in sailing
Sailors at the 1972 Summer Olympics – Tempest
Medalists at the 1972 Summer Olympics
Sportspeople from Boston